Midsummer Carnival Shaft is a public artwork by American architect Alfred C. Clas in the Court of Honor, in downtown Milwaukee, Wisconsin, United States. It is on Wisconsin Avenue, between N. 8th and N. 11th Streets.

Description
The Midsummer Carnival Shaft was commissioned by the City of Milwaukee, which chose Alfred C. Clas as the artist to design/construct it. It was built as part of the Milwaukee Midsummer Carnival, an annual festival started in 1898 to honor Wisconsin's semicentennial, but which only lasted until 1901.

The sculpture is constructed from Bedford limestone. It consists of one pillar that stands  in the median of Wisconsin Avenue. The sculpture stands nearly as tall as the surrounding buildings, and invites viewers to take notice of it as they pass by, rather than being viewed for long periods of time.

Artist
Alfred C. Clas was born in Sauk City, Wisconsin in 1860. As Clas was a local architect and city planner at the time, he was a good choice to create the publicly-located sculpture. Clas was also a partner of a local architecture firm Ferry & Clas. The two architects were responsible for much of the city planning and development that was happening at the time. Clas was a member of City Park Board, and designed the Milwaukee Auditorium and other public buildings.

The City of Milwaukee commemorated a park in Clas's name in appreciation of his work as a city planner. Alfred C. Clas Park is located in Milwaukee County, just off N. 9th St and Wells St (Latitude: 43.0405556, Longitude: -87.9238889).

References

Outdoor sculptures in Milwaukee
1900 sculptures
Monuments and memorials in Wisconsin
History of Milwaukee
Articles containing video clips
Limestone sculptures in Wisconsin
1900 establishments in Wisconsin